David Sebastian Klement Rozehnal (born 5 July 1980) is a Czech former footballer who currently plays as a defender for amateur club Sokol Kožušany (Czech 7th tier). He previously played for a host of European clubs, making over 400 appearances in a career spanning almost two decades, and retired from the professional game in April 2018.

Early life
Rozehnal was born in Šternberk and raised in Kožušany. He comes from a sports family, his father was a second-league football player, his mother played competitive handball. His father then trained amateur club Sokol Kožušany, where Rozehnal started with football.

Club career

Sigma Olomouc
Rozehnal began his career at SK Sigma Olomouc, where his performances earned him a place in the Czech Republic under-21 team.

Club Brugge
In 2003, he was signed by Belgian club Club Brugge. In 2004, Rozehnal played for the Czech Republic at the European Championship where the team made it to the semi-finals before being knocked out by Greece. He won the Belgian Cup in his first season with Brugge and the Belgian League in 2005.

Paris Saint-Germain

He signed for Paris Saint-Germain in June 2005. At the end of the 2006–07 season, he was named as the club's Player of the Year. His form resulted in reported interest from Borussia Dortmund, Newcastle United and Sevilla. Sources close to the defender confirmed that he would favour a move to Newcastle.

Newcastle United
On 22 June 2007, it was confirmed by the player's agent that a "definite agreement" had been reached for the player to join Newcastle United. He underwent a medical check on 25 June and Newcastle confirmed the transfer had been completed on 29 June for a fee of £2.9 million.

On 11 August Rozehnal made his debut for Newcastle against Bolton Wanderers.

Lazio
Rozehnal left Newcastle for Lazio, on loan until the end of the 2007–08 season, on 31 January 2008, despite having only signed in June 2007. After only playing seven times for Lazio during his loan spell, it remained unclear if they wanted to sign him on a permanent deal. On 9 June 2008, Lazio officially announced they had signed Rozehnal on a permanent basis, with Newcastle recouping the full £2.9 million which they initially paid for the defender.

Hamburger SV

After only one year in Italy, Rozehnal left Lazio, on 29 July 2009 for German top club Hamburger SV, signing a contract until 30 June 2012. After a poor season with several costly errors by Rozehnal, he was removed from the first team and asked to find a new club.

Lille
On 31 August 2010, Hamburg confirmed that Rozehnal would leave for French side Lille on a year-long loan, with the German club still paying part of his salary.  While at Lille, his side reached the 2011 Coupe de France Final where he faced former side PSG.  Lille prevailed 1–0 in the final, claiming their first Coupe de France trophy since 1955. After the 2010–11 season with Lille, Rozehnal signed for Lille on a permanent basis.

K.V. Oostende
On 29 June 2015, he joined Jupiler Pro League club K.V. Oostende and spent three seasons playing for the Belgian side.

Retirement
Rozehnal retired from professional football on 4 April 2018 and joined Sokol Kožušany, who play in the seventh tier of the Czech Republic league system. His brother, Marek, also plays for the same club. He made his debut for the club the following weekend.

International career
Rozehnal was part of the Czech side which won the UEFA U-21 Championships in 2002. He made his debut for the Czech Republic national team in a friendly match against Italy (2:2) on 18 February 2004. Rozehnal represented his country at Euro 2004 and played in all three of Czech Republic's matches at the 2006 FIFA World Cup. On 12 August 2009, he scored his only goal in a 3-1 friendly home win against Belgium. He was named in the Czech Republic's squad for Euro 2008 and played in all three of the group stage games. 

Rozenhal ended his career with a total of 60 caps.

Honours

Club Brugge
 Belgian Pro League: 2004–05
 Belgian Cup: 2003–04
 Belgian Super Cup: 2003, 2004

PSG
 Coupe de France: 2005–06

Lazio
 Coppa Italia: 2008–09

Lille
 Coupe de France: 2010–11
 Ligue 1: 2010–11

Personal life
Rozehnal is married to Petra and their first child, Luka, was born on 3 October 2007.

References

External links

 
 
 
 

1980 births
Living people
People from Šternberk
Czech footballers
Czech Republic under-21 international footballers
Czech Republic international footballers
SK Sigma Olomouc players
Club Brugge KV players
Paris Saint-Germain F.C. players
Newcastle United F.C. players
S.S. Lazio players
Hamburger SV players
Lille OSC players
K.V. Oostende players
UEFA Euro 2004 players
2006 FIFA World Cup players
UEFA Euro 2008 players
Czech First League players
Belgian Pro League players
Ligue 1 players
Premier League players
Serie A players
Bundesliga players
Expatriate footballers in Belgium
Expatriate footballers in France
Expatriate footballers in England
Expatriate footballers in Italy
Expatriate footballers in Germany
Czech expatriate footballers
Association football defenders
Sportspeople from the Olomouc Region